Jacques de Boutier de la Cardonnie (Villeneuve-sur-Lot, 5 September 1727 — Jérémie, November 1791)  was a French Navy officer. He notably served during the War of American Independence.

Biography 
La Cardonnie joined the Navy as a volunteer in 1744, and became a Garde-Marine in 1746. He served on Alcyon in the Caribbean and in Canada, and was promoted to Ensign on 17 May 1751.

In 1753, he was accepted as a member of the Académie de Marine. He was promoted to Lieutenant on 17 April 1757, and to Captain in February 1772.

In 1767, La Cardonnie was captain of Bergère. He surveyed the coast of Saint-Domingue. In 1769, he sailed Bergère to Havana, Rochefort, Bordeaux and Saint-Domingue.

La Cardonnie captained the 74-gun Diadème at the Battle of Ushant on 27 July 1778. She was nominally in the rear-guard of the French fleet, but since the Orvilliers' line was in reverse order, her position at the lead ship of the Third Division of the Blue Squadron made her the first ship of the battle line. After the battle, he was subject of an inquiry for his failure to engage the British. He wrote a memorandum in his defence, but was relieved of command.

In 1779, La Cardonnie had a duel in Paris with his former first officer, Schantz. Schantz was exiled to Sweden as punishment.

In 1780, La Cardonnie captained the 74-gun Actif and cruised off Cadiz and Saint-Vincent. He captured the British Hercule, Wright, master, off Saint-Vincent. La Cardonnie proposed to use Actif for commerce raiding in addition to her usual duties of convoy escort.

Sources and references 
 Notes

Citations

References
 
 
 

External links
 
 

French Navy officers
French military personnel of the American Revolutionary War
1727 births
1791 deaths